General Horner may refer to:

Charles T. Horner Jr. (1916–1992), U.S. Army major general
Chuck Horner (born 1936), U.S. Air Force four-star general
Matthew C. Horner (1901–1972), U.S. Marine Corps major general